Pyrausta plagalis is a moth in the family Crambidae. It was described by Frank Haimbach in 1908. It is found in North America, where it has been recorded from California, Montana and Oklahoma.

The wingspan is 25 mm. Adults have been recorded on wing in April and from July to September.

Taxonomy
The species was formerly treated as a subspecies of Pyrausta subsequalis.

References

Moths described in 1908
plagalis
Moths of North America